Astragalus albanicus is a species of milkvetch that is endemic to the Abşeron and Gobustan districts of Azerbaijan. It can be found on dry clayey sites and shingle slopes up to the mid montane zone. It is threatened by small-scale development.

References

albanicus
Endemic flora of Azerbaijan
Endangered flora of Asia